The Star Riders' Championship was the forerunner of the Speedway World Championship and was inaugurated in 1929. The competition was sponsored by The Star, which was a London evening newspaper at that time.

For the first year it was split into two sections, Britain and Overseas, as it was felt that the Australians and Americans were too strong for the British riders.

The format changed over the years until by 1935 it was run in the 16 riders 20-heat formula that was to become the recognised formula for the World Championship and most other individual events until the advent of the Grand Prix in 1995. When the World Championship was inaugurated in 1936, the Star Riders' Championship ceased.

Results
1929-1935

References

 
Speedway competitions in the United Kingdom
Recurring sporting events established in 1929
Recurring sporting events disestablished in 1935
Defunct sports competitions in England